Volck is a German surname. Notable people with the surname include:

Adalbert J. Volck (1828–1912), American dentist, cartoonist, and caricaturist
Alexander Volck, German writer

See also
Vock
Volk (surname)

German-language surnames